South Carolina elected its members October 9–10, 1820.

See also 
 1821 South Carolina's 9th congressional district special election
 1820 and 1821 United States House of Representatives elections
 List of United States representatives from South Carolina

Notes 

1820
South Carolina
United States House of Representatives